Guy Penrod is a gospel music singer. He is known for his work as the lead singer of the Gaither Vocal Band, a position he held from 1994 to 2008.

Career

Penrod is a graduate of Liberty University. Starting in the 1980s, he worked as a studio singer, backing up voices such as Carman, Steve Green, Amy Grant, Michael W. Smith, Garth Brooks, Shania Twain, James Ingram, and Phillips, Craig & Dean.  He was also a member of the Christ Church Choir (as was another future Gaither Vocal Band member, Jonathan Pierce). During his years in the studio, he met Bill Gaither for the first time. He also made regular appearances on TNN's Music City Tonight as a background singer in the mid-1990s. In 1989 Penrod contributed a couple of tracks as lead vocal on a Brentwood cassette (C-5103N) titled "Following The Sun - Island Music For Believers".

Penrod also performed briefly with the Stamps Quartet in 1987, while employed at Opryland.

After accepting the position with the Gaither Vocal Band in 1994, Penrod became internationally known for his powerful vocals and broad singing range. He has performed in Gaither Homecoming concerts all over the U.S. and Canada, as well as in Europe, Australia, and Africa. In 1999, he performed a duet with the Cathedral Quartet's lead singer Glen Payne on their Farewell Celebration video.

Penrod performed for the grand opening of Jerry Falwell's new Thomas Road Baptist Church new 6,000 seat sanctuary.

His album, The Best of Guy Penrod, reached No. 92 on the Billboard 200 on August 6, 2005. The DVD release was certified platinum by the RIAA.

The Gaither Vocal Band's 2006 release was entitled Give It Away, followed by Lovin' Life in 2008. Penrod won a Grammy Award for his work on the "Lovin Life" project.

In a press release on January 13, 2009, Bill Gaither announced that Penrod would be leaving the Gaither Vocal Band and starting a solo career.

In August 2009, Penrod released his debut solo album, Breathe Deep, on the Servant Records label. Produced by veteran country music producer and studio musician Brent Rowan, the album consists of positive country music with Christian undertones.

Penrod was inducted into the Texas Gospel Music Hall of Fame in 2011.

Penrod's sophomore solo album Hymns debuted at No. 1 on the Nielsen SoundScan Southern Gospel retail chart and became the top-selling southern gospel album of 2012. Hymns sold over 100,000 units.

In 2012, Penrod became the new host of Gospel Music Showcase, a popular Daystar Television Network program that focuses on southern gospel music. It can be seen every Saturday. The show has been awarded an Emmy.

Penrod won "Soloist of the Year" from the National Quartet Convention in 2013.

Penrod released his third solo project titled Worship in May 2014. In September 2014, Penrod released his first solo Christmas project entitled "Christmas." It became the No. 2 album in Cracker Barrel stores with 30,000 units sold, second only to Blake Shelton. Also in 2014, Penrod was inducted into the Gospel Music Hall of Fame alongside the Gaither Vocal Band.

Penrod released his first solo DVD entitled Live: Hymns & Worship in January 2016. The Project was filmed at Thomas Road Baptist Church. The release debuted at No. 1 on the Billboard chart for music videos sold upon its release. The album debuted at #2 on the "Billboard" chart for contemporary Christian music.

Penrod was a featured performer at the Faith Freedom & Future Inaugural Ball hosted by the Family Research Council, following the January 2017 inauguration of U.S. President Donald Trump in Washington, DC.

In March 2017, Penrod returned with an album entitled Classics. The album was a new solo recording of popular songs he performed during his tenure with the Gaither Vocal Band.

Penrod has often appeared on the stage of the "Grand Ole Opry" as a guest artist.

Penrod reached back into the well of beloved hymns with his 7th solo release. Blessed Assurance was released in February 2018. The album includes Penrod singing twelve newly recorded hymns featuring his signature country sound.

Personal life
Penrod and his wife, Angie (Clark), have eight children—seven boys and a girl. All of their children are home schooled.

Discography

Solo

With the Gaither Vocal Band

 1995: Southern Classics, Vol. 2
 1997: Loving God & Loving Each Other
 1998: Still The Greatest Story Ever Told
 1999: God Is Good
 2000: I Do Believe
 2002: Everything Good
 2003: A Cappella
 2004: The Best Of The GVB
 2006: Give It Away
 2007: Together, feat. Ernie Haase & Signature Sound
 2008: Lovin' Life
 2008: Christmas Gaither Vocal Band Style
 2009: Reunion, Vol. 1 & 2
 2019:  Reunion

Singles

Music videos

References

Living people
20th-century American singers
20th-century Christians
21st-century American singers
21st-century Christians
American performers of Christian music
Hobbs High School alumni
Liberty University alumni
People from Taylor, Texas
Southern gospel performers
20th-century American male singers
21st-century American male singers
Year of birth missing (living people)